The 62nd Ohio Infantry Regiment was an infantry regiment in the Union Army during the American Civil War.

Service
The 62nd Ohio Infantry Regiment was organized in Zanesville, McConnellsville, and Somerton, Ohio, beginning September 17, 1861, and mustered in for three years service on December 24, 1861, under the command of Colonel Francis Bates Pond.

The regiment was attached to 2nd Brigade, Landers' Division, Army of the Potomac, to March 1862. 2nd Brigade, Shields' Division, Banks' V Corps, and Department of the Shenandoah, to May 1862. 2nd Brigade, Shields' Division, Department of the Rappahannock, to July 1862. 3rd Brigade, 2nd Division, IV Corps, Army of the Potomac, to September 1862. Ferry's Brigade, Division at Suffolk, Virginia, VII Corps, Department of Virginia, to January 1863. 1st Brigade, 3rd Division, XVIII Corps, Department of North Carolina, to February 1863. 3rd Brigade, 2nd Division, XVIII Corps, Department of the South, to April 1863. United States forces, Folly Island, South Carolina, X Corps, Department of the South, to June 1863. 1st Brigade, Folly Island, South Carolina, X Corps, to July 1863. 1st Brigade, 2nd Division, X Corps, Morris Island, South Carolina, July 1863. 2nd Brigade, Morris Island, South Carolina, X Corps, to October 1863. Howell's Brigade, Gordon's Division, Folly Island, South Carolina, X Corps, to December 1863. District Hilton Head, South Carolina, X Corps, to April 1864. 1st Brigade, 1st Division, X Corps, Army of the James, Department of Virginia and North Carolina, to December 1864. 1st Brigade, 1st Division, XXIV Corps, to September 1865.

The 62nd Ohio Infantry ceased to exist on September 1, 1865, when it was consolidated with the 67th Ohio Infantry.

Detailed Service
This regiment was organized at Zanesville, McConnellsville and Somerton from Sept. 17 to Dec. 24, 1861, to serve for three years. In Jan., 1862, it went by rail to Cumberland, Md., and there joined the forces under the command of Brig-Gen. Lander, then in camp at Patterson's Creek.  After a summer spent in strenuous activity in Virginia, in December it made several reconnaissances from Suffolk to Blackwater, in one of which a heavy skirmish was had with the enemy. It then went by transports to South Carolina and in the desperate affair at Fort Wagner in July, 1863, it lost 150 men killed, wounded and missing. In January, 1864, it re-enlisted and received the usual 30 days' veteran furlough. During the spring, summer and fall of 1864 it was almost continually under fire not a movement could be made without encountering the enemy. The men of the regiment were compelled to keep an incessant vigil and for weeks at a time dared not throw off their accouterments. In the spring of 1865 the regiment took part in the assault on the Confederate works below Petersburg, and on April 2 it was one of the foremost regiments in the assault on Fort Gregg. It also participated in the action at Appomattox Court House. About Sept. 1, 1865, it was consolidated with the 67th Ohio, and thereafter lost its identity the name of the 67th being retained.

Casualties
The regiment lost a total of 244 men during service; 11 officers and 102 enlisted men killed or mortally wounded, 2 officers and 129 enlisted men died of disease.

Commanders
 Colonel Francis Bates Pond

See also
 List of Ohio Civil War units
 Ohio in the Civil War
 Seven Days Battles
 Battle of Fort Wagner
 Siege of Charleston
 Siege of Petersburg
 Battle of Chaffin's Farm
 Appomattox Campaign

Notes

References

External links
 Ohio in the Civil War: 62nd Ohio Volunteer Infantry by Larry Stevens
 Regimental flag of the 62nd Ohio Infantry
 Regimental flag of the 62nd Ohio Infantry (probably second issue)

Military units and formations established in 1861
Military units and formations disestablished in 1865
Units and formations of the Union Army from Ohio
1861 establishments in Ohio